Margaret Bingham Stillwell (1887 – 1984) was an American librarian and bibliographer who spent most of her professional career as curator of the Annmary Brown Memorial.

Stillwell entered Pembroke College in Brown University in 1905, beginning work at the John Carter Brown Library as a student, and graduated in 1909. In 1914 she moved to the New York Public Library as a cataloguer of early Americana and in 1917 she returned to Providence as curator of the Annmary Brown Memorial Library, where she worked until her retirement in 1953. The library, initially a private collection, was transferred to Brown University in 1948, at which time Stillwell became professor of bibliography. Although she was the first woman appointed to a full professorship at Brown, she never received a full professor's salary.

Stillwell specialised in the bibliography of incunabula (books printed in the fifteenth century) and her survey Incunabula in American Libraries: A Second Census of Fifteenth-Century Books Owned in the United States, Mexico, and Canada (New York: Bibliographical Society of America, 1940) became known eponymously as Stillwell. Stillwell was a member of the Hroswitha Club of American women book collectors, and in 1977 she became the first female honorary member of the Grolier Club.

References

Further reading 
 Margaret B. Stillwell, Librarians are Human: Memories in and out of the Rare-Book World, 1907-1970 (Boston: Colonial Society of Massachusetts, 1973)
 Martha Mitchell, 'Stillwell, Margaret B.', Encyclopedia Brunoniana (1993)
 Emiko Hastings, 'Margaret Bingham Stillwell, Curator and Scholar', Adventures in Book Collecting, 7 July 2014
 Frederick R. Goff, 'Margaret Bingham Stillwell: A Personal Reminiscence', Gazette of the Grolier Club, new series, numbers 26/27 (June/December 1977), pages 30-37
 'Margaret Bingham Stillwell, An Author and Bibliographer', New York Times, 25 April 1984
 Kurt Zimmermann, 'Miss Stillwell and F. Richmond: The Recording of Incunabula in America', American Book Collecting, 20 December 2019

American bibliographers
Brown University staff
Pembroke College in Brown University alumni
People from Providence, Rhode Island
Women bibliographers
1887 births
1984 deaths